The Tech Interactive (formerly The Tech Museum of Innovation, commonly known as The Tech) is a science and technology center that offers hands-on activities, labs, design challenges and other STEAM education resources. It is located in downtown San Jose, California, adjacent to the Plaza de César Chávez.

Description

The building has a distinctive mango and azure color, and has three floors. On the lower level there is a complex multi-story sculpture titled Origin, inside a  cylindrical tower. The artwork portrays relationships among art, technology, and natural resources of the earth. Near the entrance to the building, there is Science on a Roll, a popular rolling ball sculpture by George Rhoads. The front wall is inscribed with quotations from iconic Silicon Valley entrepreneurs Bill Hewlett, David Packard, Bob Noyce, and Gordon Moore. The building was designed by Mexican architect Ricardo Legorreta.

The IMAX Dome Theater, opened in 1998 and upgraded since then, shows mainstream movies as well as educational films. It is Northern California's only domed IMAX theater and has the first dome laser projector in the world, seating up to 280 people.

The Tech is a registered 501(c)(3) nonprofit.

History
Planning began in 1978 by members of the Junior League of Palo Alto, with later assistance by the San Jose Junior League. The City of San Jose promised funding for a Technology Center of Silicon Valley in the 1980s, but progress was slow.

The first  temporary exhibit opened in 1990; The Garage, named in homage to the HP Garage, was housed in San Jose's former convention center. On October 31, 1998, a brand-new  facility was inaugurated, named The Tech Museum of Innovation. In May 2019, the organization was renamed as The Tech Interactive and announced a partnership with Discovery Education.

During the COVID-19 pandemic, The Tech Interactive temporarily closed for in-person visits in March, 2020, and published online STEM resources through "The Tech Interactive at Home", in English, and "The Tech Interactive en Casa", in Spanish.

Programs

The Tech for Global Good 

The Tech for Global Good is a program aimed at inspiring young people to become problem-solvers who make the world a better place. It evolved from The Tech Awards, a yearly ceremony known as the Oscars of Silicon Valley in which individuals and organizations were recognized for their technological contributions to improving the human condition. In 2016, The Tech announced it was expanding The Tech Awards program from a once-a-year event to a year-round program with educational materials and exhibits. Since then, Tech for Global Good has focused every year on a different theme, such as health care or data. It honors organizations under that theme as its laureates for the year, focusing on their problem-solving abilities in lesson plans, videos and other materials for students.

The Tech Challenge 
The Tech Challenge is a design challenge competition for students Grades 4–12. Since its inception in 1988, more than 25,000 students have participated in the program, in which teams of students use the engineering design process to solve a real-world problem. In past years, participants have been asked to design and build a hovercraft; a structure to withstand an earthquake; and a device to deliver water, among other challenges. One of the program's key goals is to engage students underrepresented in STEM fields.

The Tech Academies 
The Tech Academies program, launched in 2014, provides in-depth professional development for educators to help them integrate high-quality STEM curriculum in their classrooms in Silicon Valley. The two-year Tech Academies Fellowship program, through The Tech and San José State University’s College of Science, trains educators in STEM instruction, with a focus on engineering and computer science. In 2020, the Tech Academies program received the EdCom award for Innovation in Museum Education from the American Alliance of Museums, and in 2019 it won the Excellence in Museum Education award from the California Association of Museums and the office of the state superintendent of education.

School programs 
The Tech offers in-person and virtual field trips to school groups from September to June each year.  The in-person field trip program includes options such as Science Labs, Innovation Labs, and educational IMAX films.
Virtual programs include hands-on design challenges, multimedia experiences, and an expert speaker program called Book a Biologist.

The Tech offers field trip scholarships to underserved schools.

Exhibits

Lower level 
 Social Robots: Using sensors, controllers, and actuators, this exhibit allows visitors to design and build robots.
 Body Motion: Sensors in this exhibit allow visitors to see how their movement and interactions affect their physical, social, and emotional health. 
 Space Exploration: This exhibit showcases innovations in space, including a maneuverable Jet Pack chair.
 Solve for Earth: This exhibit opened in 2021 and teaches guests about living sustainably and how their actions impact the environment, highlighting the work of scientists and emerging technologies to battle the climate crisis.
 Cyber Detectives: Presented by Palo Alto Networks, this interactive exhibit opened on June 3, 2015 and teaches visitors cyber security through “training modules” and a cybersecurity mission.
 The Tech Studio: An open-to-the-public workshop space where visitors participate in maker-style activities.

Upper level 

 Body Worlds Decoded: Opened on October 15, 2017, this permanent exhibition in partnership with Body Worlds and sponsored by venture capitalist John Doerr and his wife Ann, features plastinated human anatomical specimens, supplemented by augmented reality created in partnership with the Institute for the Future and an Anatomage virtual dissection table.
 The Tech for Global Good: Opened in 2017, this exhibit features stories of innovators who have used technology to create solutions to pressing global problems, such as vaccine delivery, homelessness, and wildlife poaching. It is a part of the Tech for Global Good program.
 Reboot Reality: Opened on May 26, 2017, visitors to this space can experience various types of immersive media.
 Innovations in Healthcare: Presented by El Camino Hospital, this exhibit opened in 2016 and showcases the innovation process as seen in advances in health care technology.
 Biodesign Studio: Opened in 2016, this exhibit allows visitors an exploration of the fields of synthetic biology, bioengineering, biological design, and DIY biology.

Past exhibits

1998 – Grand Opening, five galleries: Innovation: Silicon Valley and Beyond, Life Tech: The Human Machine, Exploration: New Frontiers, Communications: Global Connections, and Center of the Edge (for shorter-term exhibits)

2002 – Imagination Playground exhibits: You Cannot Catch Me, Fuzzy Spot, PlayPath Dots, Bend The Rule, Glow Stones (Nami Orbs), Spy Houses, Maracas, Light Beads, Elusive Dots, Bug Puppet

2004 – Genetics: Technology with a Twist exhibits: A letter to policymaker, GeneKid Phone, Counselor Phone, Incubator, Gene Array Simulator, Wet Lab Counters

2004 – Silicon Workshop exhibits: Hardwired Chip, Potato Head exhibit

2005 – NetPlanet (a.k.a. Internet 2004) exhibits: Crazy Connection, Internet Globe exhibit, Whack A Spam, Arm Wrestling, TrendPlay

2005 – Calpine (repurposed later into Green by Design) exhibit: Calpine bike-generator

2006 – Green by Design exhibits: SuperCap Cars exhibit, Energy Tower, Regenerative Braking, Sage Glass, Smart Window, Solar Collector, Solar Hybrid Lighting

2007 – Idea House

2008 – The Tech Virtual Test Zone (Art Film and Music) exhibits: WikiSonic, Avatar Mirror, Connecting Point, Mashup Easel, MIDI VJ, Musical Chair, Tilty Table

2009 – Tech Awards Gallery (a.k.a. UcanTu) exhibits: Life-Line Radio, Bare Foot College, Tree of Hope, Adaptive Lens, Cell Bazaar,  Canopy, MorSand Filter

2010 – Silicon Valley Innovation Gallery Phase I exhibits: Transistors, Speed of Processor, Intel Microchip, and sponsored exhibits from Nvidia, Google, and Adobe

2011 – The Tech Test Zone exhibits: Digital Foam, PIXEL, Sound Circles, GigaPixel Viewer, Mmmtsss

2012 – Silicon Valley Innovation Gallery Phase II exhibits: ReFace, Social Circles, Reactable

2014 – REBOOT: Music exhibit: Tim Thompson's Space Palette

2014 – Body Metrics

In the past, The Tech rented out Parkside Hall from the City of San José to host traveling exhibits. In 2007, this hall was the home to the exhibit known as Body Worlds 2, which brought in more than 280,000 guests.  In winter of 2008, there was a special Leonardo da Vinci exhibit (called Leonardo: 500 Years into the Future) that displayed some of his inventions, discoveries, and artwork; it ended January 25, 2009, after a three-week extension. The Tech also hosted Star Wars: Where Science Meets Imagination from October 19, 2013, to March 23, 2014.

See also

 Children's Discovery Museum of San Jose
 Exploratorium

References

External links
 Website

Technology museums in California
Museums in San Jose, California
Children's museums in California
Computer museums in California
Science centers
Science museums in California
IMAX venues
Science and technology in the San Francisco Bay Area
Tourist attractions in Silicon Valley
Museums established in 1990
1990 establishments in California
Association of Science-Technology Centers member institutions
Charities based in California
Domes
1990s architecture in the United States
Postmodern architecture in California
Ricardo Legorreta buildings
501(c)(3) organizations